is a Japanese graphic designer and composer who is widely known for his work at the game development studio Treasure.

He started his career by joining Konami in 1989 where he worked on a number of arcade titles. In 1992, Iuchi and a number of Konami employees including Masato Maegawa and Norio Hanzawa splintered away from the company to form Treasure. His first game for the new company was the critically acclaimed Gunstar Heroes.

In 1995, Iuchi left Treasure to join Time Warner Interactive but soon left due to disagreements with the company's business practices. He was re-hired by Treasure in 1997 where he worked on his first project as a director, Radiant Silvergun.

Despite a new string of successes including Ikaruga and Gradius V, Iuchi once again left Treasure in 2006. He resurfaced in 2007 as a freelance graphic designer and has since worked with Treasure on the Xbox Live Arcade port of Ikaruga and Bleach: Versus Crusade for the Wii. In 2012 he directed Kokuga for G.Rev. As of 2013 he works at M2.

Works
Quarth (1989) - Graphics
Aliens (1990) - 2nd Player and Demonstration Graphics
Escape Kids (1991) - Character Graphics
The Simpsons (1991) - 1st Boss and Character Display Graphics
Bucky O'Hare (1992) - Character, Effects, and Demonstration Graphics
Gunstar Heroes (1993) - All Background Graphics and Title Logo
Alien Soldier (1995) - Stages 1–9 Background Graphics
Light Crusader (1995) - Background, Effects, and 70% Character Graphics, 2 Pieces of Music
Shinrei Jusatsushi Taroumaru (1997) - 70% Background Graphics, 50% Boss Graphics, Other
Radiant Silvergun (1998) - Director, Planner, All Background Graphics, Effects
Sin and Punishment: Hoshi no Keishōsha (2000) - 90% Background Graphics, Effects, Other
Ikaruga (2001) - Director, Planner, Prototype Production, 70% Background Graphics, Effects, All Music
Gradius V (2004) - Director, Planner, 60% Background Graphics, Effects
Ikaruga XBLA (2008) - Graphic Data Conversion, Additional Graphics
Bleach: Versus Crusade (2008) - 90% Background Graphics, Lighting 
Strania (2011) - 10% Background Graphics
Kokuga (2012) - Director, Planner, 80% Background Graphics, Effects
3D After Burner II (2013) - Planner, Graphic Designer
3D Thunder Blade (2013) - Graphic Designer
Ubusuna (TBA) - Director, Music

References

External links
 Hiroshi Iuchi's Website

1967 births
Japanese graphic designers
Living people